Townsville Kern United is the predecessor of the current North Queensland Football Federation (NQFF) State Premier League team, the North Queensland Razorbacks.
Townsville Kern United formed in the late seventies and ran until 1982.

History
Townsville Kern United enjoyed success in the state competition during the 1980s, producing much local talent. This is often considered the glory days of football in North Queensland, where each home game attracted attendances of up to 10,000 spectators at the Townsville Sports Reserve.
In 1982 they won both the Queensland State league and Ampol State cup. The only state club side to achieve the double.
The club colours were yellow shirts and Royal Navy blue shorts with the club sponsor "Kern" a local building company blazoned across the chest.
All home games were played on a Saturday evening attracting much support from the locals, with back page headlines in the Townsville Bulletin often the norm whenever they played. The code was extremely well supported, more so than most National Soccer League (NSL) teams of that era.

Townsville Kern United also managed to attract several high-profile players, such as Paul Wormley, who had previously played professional football in England for Barnsley.
Allan Clarke the famous Leeds and England striker of the 70's appeared as a guest player for the club in 1981.

Townsville
Sport in Townsville
Soccer clubs in Queensland